A mukhtar is a village chief in many Arab countries and Cyprus.

Mukhtar may also refer to:
 Mukhtar (name), an Arabic given name and surname
 Mukhtar Army, a Shi'a Iraqi militia group formed in February 2013
 Mukhtar Museum, in Cairo, Egypt
 Mkhitarashen (or Mukhtar), a village in Nagorno-Karabakh

See also
 
 Mokhtar (disambiguation)
 Muhtar (disambiguation)
 Muhtar (title)